The 27th Golden Disc Awards took place on January 15–16, 2013, at the Sepang International Circuit in Kuala Lumpur, Malaysia. It honored the best in South Korean music released from January 1, 2012, through December 2012. Nicole Jung, Jung Yong-hwa, Kim Da-som, Lee Hong-gi served as the hosts for the ceremony.

Criteria 
The winners of the digital music and album categories were determined by music sales (80%) and a panel of music experts (20%). The Rookie Artist of the Year award was based on album sales (80%), a panel of music experts (10%) and online votes (10%), while the Popularity Award was based on online votes (80%) and album sales (20%).

Winners and nominees

Main awards 
Winners and nominees are listed in alphabetical order. Winners are listed first and emphasized in bold.

Genre awards

Special awards

References 

2012 in South Korean music
2012 music awards
Golden Disc Awards ceremonies